Ilieși may refer to several villages in Romania:

 Ilieși, a village in Racova Commune, Bacău County
 Ilieși, a village, part the town of Sovata, Mureș County

See also 
 Ilie (name)
 Iliești (disambiguation)